Lismore is a city in northeastern New South Wales, Australia and the main population centre in the City of Lismore local government area; it is also a regional centre in the Northern Rivers region of the State. It is situated on a low flood plain on the banks of the Wilsons River near the latter's junction with Leycester Creek, both tributaries of the Richmond River which enters the Pacific Ocean at Ballina,  to the east. The original settlement initially developed as a grazing property in the 1840s, then became a timber and agricultural town and inland port based around substantial river traffic, which prior to the development of the road and rail networks was the principal means of transportation in the region. Use of the river for transport declined and then ceased around the mid-twentieth century, however by that time Lismore (which was elevated to city status in 1946) had become well established as the largest urban centre in the region, providing its surrounding area with a range of services. The city is also located on the Bruxner Highway which crosses the Wilsons River at Lismore, and was formerly a stop on the Casino-Murwillumbah railway line. It is the home of one of the three campuses of Southern Cross University.

With its low-lying position adjacent to the Wilsons River, which can rise rapidly following periods of high rainfall in its catchment, the centre of Lismore is susceptible to flooding, although it is partly protected by a system of levees and flood gates. Noteworthy recent floods occurred in 1974, 2017 in the aftermath of Cyclone Debbie and the worst ever in 2022. A budget was announced for additional flood mitigation works in November 2018.

History

Pre-colonial history
The city of Lismore lies in the Bundjalung people's nation area. However, the actual area of the Bundjalung people from Evans Head is currently under examination, as well as the actual origin of the name Bundjalung. It has been suggested that the Aboriginal people called the area Tuckurimbah meaning "glutton."

Early colonial history
Ward Stephens took up the run in the same year, but the subtropical climate was unsuited for sheep grazing, so it was eventually abandoned. In January 1845, William and Jane Wilson took it over. The Wilsons were Scottish immigrants, who arrived in New South Wales in May 1833. Mrs. Wilson named the property after the small island of Lismore, one of the Inner Hebrides in Loch Linnhe, Argyleshire.

In 1855, the surveyor Frederick Peppercorne was instructed by Sir Thomas Mitchell to determine a site for a township in the area. Peppercorne submitted his map of the proposed village reserve on 16 February 1856. The chosen site was William Wilson's homestead paddock and the area was proclaimed the "Town of Lismore" in the NSW Government Gazette on 1 May 1856. The township was soon settled and its post office was opened on 1 October 1859.

From the 1840s onwards, timber cutters moved up the Richmond River from its Ballina entrance felling timber from the extensive, previously untouched subtropical rainforest covering the region known as the "Big Scrub"; their primary interest was the Australian red cedar, Toona ciliata, known locally as "red gold", which was highly prized for its appearance, ease of working, and pest resistance. At that time there was no substantial network of roads so rivers were the primary means of access and bulk transportation. Despite its low-lying position and propensity for flooding (which was to cause problems in subsequent times), Lismore developed as an inland port owing to its location at the highest navigable point for large cargo-carrying vessels on the north arm of the Richmond, later renamed the Wilsons, River. For the second half of the 19th century the primary industries of the Lismore region continued to be cattle grazing and timber, supporting a growing economy and population and the development of secondary industries which included ship building, transportation, saw milling, tallow manufacturing and more. As the Big Scrub was cleared, it was steadily replaced with new pasture which formed the basis of a flourishing dairy industry, and many processing plants ("butter factories") and dairy cooperatives were established throughout the region. Infrastructure development in Lismore continued, including the presence of three schools by 1879, a new Government Wharf in 1880, two new bridges over the river in 1884 and 1885, and a new post office building (1898); by the end of that century Lismore had a population of over 4,500, although had suffered from some ravages including numerous floods plus a period of drought in the last half of the 1890s.

At the beginning of the 20th century, river navigation was still the mainstay of transportation in Lismore, the principal operator being the North Coast Steam Navigation Company. The dairy industry was performing strongly, employing hundreds of small family-owned operations, the Lismore region becoming the centre for dairy production from the surrounding farms and the richest dairy district in Australia. A railway station had opened in 1894 as a stop on the Murwillumbah railway line which ran from Lismore to the coast at Byron Bay and then on to Murwillumbah, and subsequently in 1903 inland to Casino, but was not connected to any national network. However, as the century progressed, development of a better road network and the advance of motor transportation made inroads into the long-term success of both the river and rail traffic which eventually declined: river traffic was also affected by requisitioning of ships during the second world war and the largest shipping line operating on the two arms of the Richmond River, the North Coast Steam Navigation Company, went into liquidation in 1954; the railway line lasted until 2004 when it was closed on purely economic grounds after advising that it was "unprofitable" to continue providing services to Murwillumbah, putting an end to 110 years of rail transport in the region. Meanwhile, economic development in Lismore continued, including construction of a new School of Arts (1907, destroyed by fire in 1932), building of churches for four denominations, opening of a new Norco (dairy farmers' cooperative) factory in 1931, and other utilities.

City status
Lismore was officially gazetted as a city on 9 September 1946, with grant of an official coat of arms on 29 January 1947. In the early 1950s, civic pride was boosted by a visit from the newly crowned Queen Elizabeth II with her consort who visited the city in February 1954, staying at the city's Gollan Hotel.

Television came to the city in 1956 and a local channel commenced broadcast in 1962 in the suburb of Goonellabah, which had been incorporated into the city of Lismore four years earlier. In 1969, the aerodrome at South Lismore received its licence from the Department of Civil Aviation, becoming the basis of the future Lismore Airport. The 1960s were something of a boom time in development for Lismore, although the dairy industry was starting to decline and by the end of that decade and into the 1970s, many farmers turned to raising beef cattle instead, or simply let their land condition lapse.

Later, especially following the 1973 "alternative society" Aquarius Festival, which was held in the nearby village of Nimbin, the area began to attract so-called "alternative lifestylers" who were able to buy ex-dairying land at reasonable prices and re-invigorate the area with a range of pursuits and values of interest to a new generation, including an interest in owner-building of residences, experiments in communal living, environmental awareness and various artistic and creative activities, leading to badging of the area around Lismore as the "rainbow region". Meanwhile, Lismore has also become a regional centre for higher education: the original Lismore Teachers College (1970 onwards) becoming first the Northern Rivers College of Advanced Education in 1973, then an associate member of the University of New England, and finally (together with UNE-Coffs Harbour Centre), forming the Lismore Campus of the new Southern Cross University (established 1 January 1994). In addition, tourism has become an important contributor to the region's economy as well as the development of new agricultural products such as macadamias, avocado and stone fruit, pecans, and boutique coffee plantations, which are well suited to the rich volcanic soils, subtropical climate and moderately high rainfall of the area.

As traditional agricultural and manufacturing sectors have declined somewhat, so employment in the service sector has expanded. At the 2016 census, within Lismore City and the surrounding region (43,135 persons) the top employment sectors reported were Health Care and Social Assistance (4,534 persons), Retail Trade (2,491 persons), Education and Training (2,448 persons) and Accommodation and Food Services (1,297 persons), followed by Public Administration and Safety (1,204 persons), Agriculture, Forestry and Fishing (1,018 persons), Manufacturing (1,000 persons) and Construction (967 persons).

Surviving buildings of historical interest within Lismore City include the old Council Chambers (1928) in Molesworth Street designed by William Gilroy, now home to the Richmond River Historical Society Museum with a collection of objects, documents and photographs relevant to the historical development of the area, including Aboriginal artifacts; the Art Nouveau post office (1897), designed by W.L. Vernon; the original Australian Joint Stock Bank (1891), built in the Italianate style, now the T & G Building; the classical revival courthouse (1883) in Zadoc Street; and various churches including St Andrew's Anglican Church (1904), St Carthage's Roman Catholic Cathedral (1892–1907), the Uniting (formerly Methodist) Church (1908–09), the Church of Christ (1923), and St Paul's Presbyterian Church (1907–08). The commercial city centre retains many shopfronts ranging in date from the late nineteenth to mid twentieth centuries with little modern intrusion; a feature of interest is the presence of numerous arcades, for example the 1920s Star Court Arcade, which includes the 1921 Star Court Theatre, which allow shoppers to continue to shop in comfort in the presence of subtropical downpours as well as extremes of heat or cold.

The city also encompasses a range of parks and gardens, some bordering the river, as well as Rotary Park, a patch of regenerated rainforest close to the centre of the city, and a 27 ha remnant of the "Big Scrub" in the form of the Wilson Nature Reserve (see below).

Heritage listings
Lismore has three sites listed on the New South Wales State Heritage Register, namely:
 Colemans Bridge over Leycester Creek
 Lismore railway station group
 Lismore railway underbridges

An additional  items are listed by the local council on Local Environmental Plans under the Environmental Planning and Assessment Act, 1979, including:
 The Commonwealth Bank building, Molesworth Street
 Dalley Street Conservation Area
 The former Government Savings Bank, Woodlark Street
 Lismore Fire Station, Molesworth Street
 Memorial Baths, Molesworth Street
 The former Post and Telegraph Office

A full listing of heritage sites in Lismore can be generated via a search for suburb/town = "Lismore" via the New South Wales Heritage Database.

Rainforest
Lismore and surrounding towns were once part of the rainforest referred to as the "Big Scrub", of which less than one percent remains following British settlement. A section of this rainforest is viewable in the grounds of the Southern Cross University and at Wilsons Nature Reserve on Wyrallah Road.

Geography

There are a number of rainforest patches in the area, remnants of the Big Scrub. These are preserved today, with a small pocket known as Boatharbour Reserve just east of town on the Bangalow road. The nearest large and publicly accessible national park is Nightcap National Park.

Climate and weather

General characteristics
Lismore experiences a humid subtropical climate with mild to warm temperatures all year round and ample rainfall, with a long term yearly average of 1,343 mm. The subtropical climate combined with geographical features means the urban area is unusually humid when compared with surrounding areas. Humidity levels often reach 100% in summer. Lismore has 109.6 clear days annually.

Floods
Although no major environmental hazards affect the area, Lismore is renowned for frequent floods.

In 1999 a government-funded scheme to protect the CBD and South Lismore from a 1-in-10-year flood event was approved. This proposal would mean that most of the smaller floods would not enter the central area of Lismore and substantially improve the time available for the evacuation of residents and the business community in larger floods. Nonetheless, around 3000 residents of Lismore were evacuated after floods affected much of the area on 30 June 2005, many being temporarily housed on the campus of Southern Cross University. However, the new levee that had been completed two weeks prior limited damage and stopped the water reaching the Central Business District.

In the aftermath of Cyclone Debbie in March 2017, Lismore was again badly affected by flooding of up to  through all CBD businesses. Wilsons River reached  and the levee was overtopped for the first time since its completion. A modelled projection of the maximum flood extent, plus an animation, of this flood event as affecting Lismore is available on the "BigData Earth" Company website.

A budget of $8.2 million for additional flood mitigation works was announced in November 2018.

A summary of Lismore flood events from 1870 to 2017 is available here.

In 2022, Lismore and other parts of northern New South Wales and South-East Queensland were flooded. The Wilson River in Lismore reached 14.37 metres at its peak, the largest flood since modern records began.

Drought and water security
A high degree of year-to-year variation in rainfall is typical of the Northern Rivers region. Periods of reduced rainfall are often associated with El Niño events and increased rainfall with La Niña events. For example, the region experienced a significant reduction in rainfall between late 2002 and mid-2003 and again in 2007 in association with persistent and recurrent El Niño events. In common with other areas in Australia, the Lismore region can experience drought but in general, the Northern Rivers region is less drought prone than many of its neighbours, especially those west of the Great Dividing Range (see example map for the drought-affected month of September 2019 here). The municipal water supply is provided by Rous County Council via Rocky Creek Dam, which is situated in a high rainfall area within the Whian Whian State Conservation Area approximately 20 km north of the city, and can be supplemented by drawing additional water from the Wilsons River when required. According to data in the Drought Management Plan adopted by the Council in 2016, level 1 water restrictions for the whole supply region (which stretches from Woodburn in the south to Ocean Shores in the north, as well as westwards to Lismore) would be triggered if the level in Rocky Creek Dram falls to 60%, level 2 restrictions at 45% of capacity, and so on. From 2002 up to late 2019, only one period of severe water restrictions was recorded (reaching level 5 in March 2003) with one other period of lesser severity (level 1 restrictions) during the second half of 2007.

Other severe weather events
Lismore is often hit by severe storms in spring and summer. For example, there was a severe hailstorm on 9 October 2007. A tornado is an extreme rarity, but later that same month one struck nearby Dunoon. It was captured on video as it hit an electrical transformer station there.

Quantifying natural hazard risks
In a 2016 report prepared for Insurance Australia Group (IAG), the consulting company SGS Economics and Planning rated and mapped different Local Government Areas (LGAs) across Australia against a range of natural hazard risks, namely Tropical Cyclone, Storm, Bushfire, Earthquake and Flood. On a 0-5 scale where 0 = no exposure, 5 = extreme risk, the region which includes Lismore rated 1 for Earthquake, 2 for Storm and Bushfire, 3 for Tropical Cyclone and 4 for Flood risk (SGS report, Figures 1, 3, 5, 6, 8).

Demographics
 Aboriginal and Torres Strait Islander people made up 7.1% of the population.
 83.5% of people were born in Australia. The most common other countries of birth were England 2.1%, New Zealand 1.1%, Philippines 0.6%, India 0.5% and Germany 0.4%.
 87.7% of people only spoke English at home. Other languages spoken at home included Italian at 0.5%.
 The most common responses for religion were No Religion 41.8%, Catholic 19.4% and Anglican 11.8%.
The population reached a recent peak of 29,320 at June 2012 and since has experienced a gradual decline to 28,816 in 2021. The population of central Lismore in 2021 was 3,656.

Media

The Northern Star is an online tabloid newspaper based in Lismore. It covers the region from Lismore, Casino, Ballina, Byron Bay, Murwillumbah, and Tweed Heads, and, like many other regional Australian newspapers owned by NewsCorp, the newspaper ceased print editions in June 2020 and became an online-only publication. The Northern Rivers Echo is a free weekly community newspaper for Lismore, Alstonville, Wollongbar, Ballina, Casino, Nimbin and Evans Head. The Lismore CBD Magazine is a monthly e-magazine publication.

The commercial radio stations of Lismore are Triple Z (Hit Music) and 2LM 900 AM (also broadcast on 104.3FM). Both are run by Broadcast Operations Group. The community radio station is River FM 92.9 which offers an independent alternative media voice playing a diverse range of music. Other radio stations are JJJ 96.1 FM, Radio National 96.9 FM, Classic FM 95.3 and ABC North Coast 94.5 FM.

All major television network channels are available in Lismore and in the general Northern Rivers region. The networks and the channels they currently broadcast are listed as follows:
 Seven Regional (formerly Prime7), 7Two, 7mate, 7Bravo, 7flix – Seven Network owned channels.
 Nine Network (NBN Television), 9Go!, 9Gem, 9Life – Nine Network owned channels.
 10, 10 Peach, 10 Bold (NRN, owned by WIN Corporation) – Network 10 affiliated channels.
 ABC Television, ABC, ABC TV Plus, ABC Me, ABC News – part of the Australian Broadcasting Corporation National Network.
 SBS Television, SBS, SBS Viceland, SBS Food, NITV, SBS World Movies, SBS WorldWatch – Special Broadcasting Service National Network.
 Digital radio channels are also broadcast on the ABC Television and SBS Television networks.
Subscription television services are provided by Foxtel.

Business
The Norco Co-operative has its headquarters in Lismore. The main campus of Southern Cross University is in Lismore.

Education
 Southern Cross University has its home campus located in Lismore, offering undergraduate and postgraduate degrees in disciplines including business and law, tourism, humanities and social sciences, creative and performing arts, education, environment, marine and forest sciences, engineering, health and human sciences, law and Indigenous studies. The university was established in 1994 and has campuses at Coffs Harbour, New South Wales, and Gold Coast, Queensland. The university has students from more than 80 countries around the world.

Lismore and the surrounding area is home to a number of public and private schools, including:
 Our Lady Help of Christians Catholic Primary School
 St Carthage's Catholic Primary School
 Blue Hills College
 Kadina High School
 Lismore High School
 Lismore South Public School
 Richmond River High School
 St John's College, Woodlawn
 Summerland Christian College
 Trinity Catholic College, Lismore
 Vistara Primary
 Living School Lismore
 Lismore Public School

Sport and recreation
Lismore has two rugby league clubs competing in the Northern Rivers Regional Rugby League Competition:
 Lismore Marist Brothers Rams 
 Northern United Dirrawongs

Lismore Marist Brothers Rams won the prestigious Clayton Cup in 1987, as the premier local rugby league team in Country New South Wales Competitions with a 17–1 record across the season.

Lismore is a strong-hold of Association Football, with six clubs affiliated with Football Far North Coast
being located in Lismore and near surrounds:

 South Lismore – formed in 1943
 Lismore Workers – formed as Eastwood in 1949
 Lismore Thistles – formed in 1958
 Richmond Rovers – formed in 1961
 Italo Stars – formed in 1966
 Goonellabah – formed in June 1969

The Albert Park complex is home to the Far North Coast Baseball Association and Lismore is considered one of the strongest centres for Baseball in Australia.

The Lismore Swans founded in 1983 represent Lismore in Australian rules football and competes in the AFL North Coast competition.

Sister cities
Lismore formed a sister city relationship with the Japanese city of Yamatotakada in Nara Prefecture in 1963. The first such relationship established between Australia and Japan, it was initiated by Lismore-born Marist priest and writer Paul Glynn. Lismore is also a sister city of Eau Claire, Wisconsin, USA and Lismore, County Waterford, Ireland.

Leaders
 Member of NSW State Parliament for Lismore: Janelle Saffin MP (Country Labor)
 Mayor of the City of Lismore: Steve Krieg (Independent Politician)
 Deputy Mayor of the City of Lismore, Peter Colby (Independent Politician)

Notable people
Notable people from or who have lived in Lismore include:

 Peter Arnison  – Major General, Land Commander Australia 1994–1996, Governor of Queensland 1997–2003
 Julian Assange – WikiLeaks founder, once lived in Lismore
 Andrew Barr – the 7th Chief Minister of the Australian Capital Territory, was born in Lismore in 1973
 Lisa Casagrande – a footballer who played 64 internationals for the Matildas from 1994 to 2000.
 Ron Casey – Sydney based radio and television personality
 Con Colleano – a tightrope walker, was born in Lismore in 1899
 Harold Warnock Cottee – a co-founder of Cottee's drinks
 Bob Ellis – a writer, journalist, filmmaker and political commentator, was born in Lismore in 1942
 Craig Foster – former Socceroo, human rights advocate, was born in Lismore in 1969
 Paul Foster was born in Lismore in 1967.
 Peter Gahan – an Australian baseball player and the only FNCBA player to have their Australian player number retired.
 Adam Gilchrist – a cricketer, lived in Lismore from the age of 13
 Paul Glynn – a Marist missionary priest and writer, was born in Lismore in 1928
 Terry Greedy – a Socceroo goalkeeper was born in Lismore
 Grinspoon – a pop/rock band, originated in Lismore
 Nicholas Hamilton – an actor mostly known for his role as Henry Bowers in It
Lurline Hook – gold medallist diver at the 1938 British Empire Games
 Martin Kennedy – a professional rugby league player
 Brian Kelly – a professional rugby league player
 Alofiana Khan-Pereira – a professional rugby league player
 Andrew King – a professional rugby league player
 Chris King – a professional rugby league player
 John McIntosh – Australian politician, member of the New South Wales Legislative Council
 David Mead – a National Rugby League player
 Adrian Meagher – an Olympic baseball player
 Bruce Mitchell – an Oxford scholar of Old English, was born in Lismore in 1920
 Maia Mitchell – an actress best known for her role as Callie Adams Foster on The Fosters and Good Trouble
 Margaret Olley  – an Australian artist, was born in Lismore
 Nigel Roy – a professional rugby league footballer, was born in Lismore in 1974
 Tony Smith – a rugby league coach
 James Strong  – a former CEO of Qantas
 Emma Tom – a writer, journalist and media commentator
 Edwin Wilson – poet and painter, born Lismore 1942

See also

 Lismore Turf Club

References

External links

Collection of photographs of Lismore in 1995, National Library of Australia
Map of Lismore, New South Wales on OpenStreetMap
The Northern Star and Northern Rivers Echo (shared website)
Satellite map/aerial view of Lismore via Google Maps

 
Cities in New South Wales
Northern Rivers
Populated places established in 1843
1843 establishments in Australia